Vanilla chamissonis, commonly known as the Chamisso's vanilla, is a species of orchid.

The orchid is native to South America, from French Guiana through Brazil to northeastern Argentina.

The species name honors Adelbert von Chamisso.

References

External links

chamissonis
Orchids of South America
Orchids of Brazil
Orchids of Argentina
Orchids of French Guiana
Adelbert von Chamisso